Okushiri may refer to
Okushiri Island
Okushiri, Hokkaido, the main town on the island